Maqbul Ahmed (2 August,1939 – 13 April,2021) was the Ameer, or chief, of Bangladesh Jamaat-e-Islami, the largest Islamic party of Bangladesh. He was from Feni. He was appointed to that position on 17 October, 2016 after serving as acting leader for six years.

Death 
Ahmed died on 13 April 2021, from COVID-19 at Ibn Sina Medical College Hospital, Dhaka, Bangladesh.

References

Bangladesh Jamaat-e-Islami politicians
1939 births
2021 deaths
People from Feni District
Deaths from the COVID-19 pandemic in Bangladesh